Undercurrents was a Canadian news magazine television program that was hosted by Wendy Mesley. It focused on media, marketing and technology.

Overview
The series, which debuted in 1995, primarily concentrated on investigative and documentary reports about media, marketing and technology, such as examining media coverage of controversial issues. Its debut episode drew 800,000 viewers despite having received little advance publicity and having been scheduled so hastily that it wasn't even listed in that week's TV Guide listings; the episode examined the role of video in criminal trials, using the Paul Bernardo trial as its hook.

Mesley won two Gemini Awards for Best Host or Interviewer of a News or General Information Series for her work on Undercurrents, in 1999 and 2001.

In 2001, Undercurrents was folded into the new series CBC News: Disclosure, cohosted by Mesley and Diana Swain. The new show did not continue to discuss the media or technology; instead, the media analysis theme was picked up by a different new CBC series, MediaWatch.

References

External links

 Undercurrents - CBC Television
 Undercurrents - CBC
 Undercurrents - CBC

1990s Canadian television news shows
2000s Canadian television news shows
1995 Canadian television series debuts
2001 Canadian television series endings
Canadian Screen Award-winning television shows
CBC News
CBC Television original programming